Etiella chrysoporella is a species of snout moth in the genus Etiella. It is found in Australia and the Tanimbar Islands.

References

Moths described in 1879
Phycitini